{{Infobox person
| name = Pan Yuliang
| image = Pan-yuliang-self-portrait 1924.jpg
| native_name = 潘玉良
| native_name_lang = Chinese
| pronunciation  = 
| other_names = Zhang Yuliang, Chen Xiuqing, Pan Shixiu
| birth_date =   
| birth_place = Yangzhou, Jiangsu, Qing Empire
| death_date =  
| death_place = Paris, France
| resting_place = Montparnasse Cemetery, Paris
| nationality = Chinese
| education = Hong Ye, Zhu Qizhan, Wang Jiyuan
| alma_mater = 
| occupation = Painter
| television = Is the character in A soul Haunted by Painting 画魂 (1994 movie), Pan Yuliang (1990 TV series)
| known_for  = Being the character in A soul Haunted by Painting 画魂 (1994 movie), Pan Yuliang (1990 TV series)
| notable_works    =  Female Nude (女人體)
| movement = 
| style            =  
| spouse           = 
| awards = {{unbulleted list
       | Female Nude receives the Roman International Art Exhibition’s Gold Prize
       | Paris Gold Prize
       | L'art Libre Confédération Française. Salon International Prize
       | Gold Medal, French Cultural Education Prize"
       | Arts-Sciences-Lettres Prize       }}
| module        = 
}}

Pan Yuliang (14 June 1895 – 22 July 1977), born as Chen Xiuqing, also known as Zhang Yuliang (張玉良), was a Chinese painter, renowned as the first woman in the country to paint in the Western style.  She had studied in Shanghai and Paris.  Because her modernist works caused controversy and drew severe criticism in China during the 1930s, Pan returned to Paris in 1937 to live and work for the next 40 years.  She taught at the École des Beaux Arts, won several awards for her work, had exhibits internationally in Europe, the United States and Japan, and was collected by major institutions.  In 1985 after her death, much of her work was transported to China, collected by the National Art Museum in the capital of Beijing, the larger part are collected by the Anhui Museum in Hefei, the capital of Anhui Province. Nevertheless, significant paintings, sculptures and prints are still conserved in France in the collection of the Cernuschi museum. Her life as an artist has been portrayed in novels and film in China and the United States. Her art evolved within the flux of transformations where conflicting dichotomies of East and West, tradition and modernity, male chauvinism and emerging feminism co-existed. Pan is also figured as who engaged with labels, such as " contemporary/modern," " Chinese," and " woman" artist, while questioning them. Despite being remembered for introducing Western paintings to China, she was able to provide a new lens to how these women were seen through her paintings as not just objects but subjects.

 Life 

Early life and education
Zhang Yuliang was born in 1895 in Jiangsu Province.  After the death of her parents when she was 14, she was sold by her uncle to a brothel, where she was raised to become a prostitute.  She attracted the attention of Pan Zanhua, a wealthy customs official, who bought her freedom.  He married her as his second wife and helped with her education; she adopted his name as her surname. In one of her letters to her family members, she stated her will and signed as Pan-Zhang Yuliang  (Chinese: 潘張玉良). This letter can be taken as a legal document, where she used Pan-Zhang Yuliang as a signature. Therefore, Pan-Zhang Yuliang is the name that she acknowledged and preferred.

They moved to Shanghai, where she passed the exams to enter the Shanghai Art School in 1920, where she studied painting with Wang Jiyuan. Within the Shanghai Art School, Pan struggled to fit in with her peers. Due to her 'lowly' background, she was often ostracized and did not fit into the model of the 'modern Shanghai lady' — a young woman whose arts education added to their femininity and beauty. Pan was frequently described by her peers as warm-hearted and forthright, albeit if at times, blunt. Pan Yuliang is attributed as one of the first female graduates at Shanghai Art School. After her graduation, she went to Lyon and Paris for further study, sponsored by Pan Zanhua. She attended the Sino-French Institute of Lyon and Ecole National des Beaux Arts in Lyon, before finishing her studies at the Ecole National Supérieure des Beaux Arts de Paris. In 1925, she won the prestigious Rome Scholarship to study at the Accademia di Belle Arti in Rome in Italy. In Rome, she studied under Umberto Coromaldi.

Career and later life
In 1926, Pan Yuliang won the Gold Prize for her works at the Roman International Art Exhibition. In 1929, Liu Haisu invited her to teach at the Shanghai Art School and she returned to China.  She had a solo exhibit in Shanghai, where she was honored as the first Chinese female artist to paint in Western style.  She was also invited to be an art professor of the National Central University in Nanjing. She gave five solo exhibitions in China from 1929 to 1936. 

Her work was severely criticized by government officials and conservative critics - in part because she painted of nudes, however, she and the fellow woman painter Guan Zilan became favourites in the art world of the Republic of China (1912–49). Women artists trained in Western style, such as Pan and Guan, captured the fascination of the public, and were accepted as the embodiment of modernity. Pan is also appraised that she drew readily from the techniques of Chinese ink painting while subtly undermining the authority of that tradition in relation to the European art tradition. Pan Yuliang is probably best known for her female nudes and it became a staple in her artistic practice. In China, women artists were generally constricted to depictions of nature and occasionally portraiture but nudes were considered improper. Despite this, Pan continued to create various female nudes, often using herself as a model, despite the controversy it generated in the modern arts scene in China.

Pan left Shanghai for France in 1937, and settled in Paris.  There she won some acclaim.  After moving to France to pursue her work, Pan joined the faculty of the École des Beaux Arts.

She worked and lived in Paris for the next 40 years.  Chinese expatriate artists in France elected her the chairman of the Chinese Art Association.  Her works were exhibited internationally, especially in the United Kingdom, United States, Germany, Japan, Italy, Switzerland, Belgium and Greece. Despite spending nearly fifty years in Paris, Pan decided to keep her Chinese nationality. Although she struggled with poverty and often had difficulty successfully selling her art, she refused to be bound by contractual obligations with art dealers in Europe. Towards the end of her life, Pan became marginalized from both the Chinese and French art communities. In France, she was classified as a Chinese and foreign painter, excluding her from mainstream art appreciation and she spent too much time away from China to be a staple in Chinese modern art at the time.

Pan died in 1977 and was buried in the Montparnasse Cemetery of Paris.

In 1985, many of her works were returned to her native country, where they are held by the  National Art Museum of China in Beijing and the Anhui Provincial Museum in Hefei.

Legacy and honors
1926, her works won the Gold Prize at the Roman International Art Exhibition.
1959, she won the Paris Gold Prize and the Belgium Silver Prize.

The Anhui Museum holds a collection of Pan Yuliang's works of art including 4000 pieces, 3892 sketches,393 ink paintings,361 oil paintings, 13 block prints, 6 engravings, and 4 sculptures. Besides all these works of art only ten of her oil paintings are on the market which makes her works so valuable.

In popular culture
Her story is loosely told in the novel Hua Hun (A Soul Haunted by Painting) (1984) by Shih Nan. It was adapted as the Chinese film by the same name, which was released in 1994 starring the actress Gong Li as the artist. Her life story is also re-enacted in the 2004 TVB drama Painting Soul where her role was played by Michelle Reis. The Huangmei opera The Female Painter from the Brothel (風塵女畫家) starring Ma Lan is also based on her life.

Jennifer Cody Epstein's novel The Painter from Shanghai'' (2008) is also based on Pan Yuliang's life, and has been translated into fourteen different languages. Marie Laure de Shazer, specialized in Chinese language, also wrote a book about Pan Yuliang, "Pan Yu Liang, La Manet de Shanghai", based on her life in China and France.

References

External links

"Pan Yuliang's Paintings", Jennifer Cody Epstein Website
"Pan Yuliang's Paintings", Anhui Museum
"Pan Yuliang", Express Paintings 
"Pan Yuliang", Lingnanart (in Chinese)

1895 births
1977 deaths
Qing dynasty painters
Republic of China painters
Chinese feminists
French feminists
Academic staff of the École des Beaux-Arts
French women painters
Painters from Yangzhou
20th-century French women artists
Chinese emigrants to France